John Coffin may refer to:
 John Coffin (judge) (died 1838), judge and army officer
 John Coffin (scientist), American virologist
 John H. C. Coffin (1815–1890), American astronomer and educator